This is a list of electoral results for the Electoral division of Stuart in Northern Territory elections.

Members for Stuart

Election results

Elections in the 2010s

Elections in the 2000s

Elections in the 1990s

Elections in the 1980s

Elections in the 1970s

 Preferences were not distributed.

References

Northern Territory electoral results by district